Thomas de Montmorency Murray-Prior (27 January 1848 – 11 December 1902) was a politician in Queensland, Australia. He was a Member of the Queensland Legislative Assembly.

Early life
He was born in Bromelton to politician Thomas Lodge Murray-Prior and Matilda Harpur. He attended school in Brisbane and Hobart, working as a pastoralist at Maroon before becoming a miner in the Palmer goldfield.

He married Florence Claudia Moor on 18 March 1878 at Bowen. He inherited Maroon Station on his father's death in 1892, and also became vice-president of the Queensland Chamber of Agriculture.

Politics
He was elected to the Queensland Legislative Assembly as the member for Fassifern in March 1902, but he died in Brisbane in December of that year.

Later life
He died on 11 December 1902 at Maroon following a long internal illness; his death was not unexpected.

References

1848 births
1902 deaths
Members of the Queensland Legislative Assembly
Australian miners
19th-century Australian politicians